Shah Nazari may refer to:
Shah Nazari, Kerman
Shah Nazari, Khuzestan